Ferdinand I (Ferdinando Maria Filippo Lodovico Sebastiano Francesco Giacomo; 20 January 1751 – 9 October 1802) was Duke of Parma, Piacenza and Guastalla from his father's death on 18 July 1765 until he ceded the duchy to France by the Treaty of Aranjuez on 20 March 1801. He was a member of the Spanish House of Bourbon.

Early life
Born at the Ducal Palace of Colorno as the second child and only son of Philip, Duke of Parma and Princess Louise Élisabeth of France, he was considered to be the favorite grandson of his maternal grandfather King Louis XV of France. As a grandson in the male line of King Philip V of Spain, he was created an infante of Spain upon his father's death. As a grandson of King Louis, Ferdinand was also a direct descendant of England's William the Conqueror. 
As the heir to one of the largest collection of sovereign duchies, Ferdinand was an attractive candidate for many royal ladies of Europe. Probable candidates included Princess Maria Beatrice Ricciarda of Modena, daughter of Ercole III d'Este and (like Ferdinand) an in law of Marie Antoinette. She was, through her mother, heiress to the Duchy of Massa and Carrara, but despite being the last descendant of the Este, she was not also the heiress to the Duchy of Modena and Reggio due to the Salic law that was in force there. Ferdinand's possible marriage to Princess Maria Beatrice was, however, very unlikely since the latter had been engaged to Archduke Leopold of Austria at a very young age and later on to Leopold's younger brother Archduke Ferdinand upon the death of an older brother, Archduke Charles. It is likely that a union between Parma and Modena was only promoted in vain by Parma's minister, Guillaume du Tillot, since the engagement of Modena's princess to an Austrian Archduke was already agreed very early on. Another candidate was Louise Marie Thérèse Bathilde d'Orléans who offered a very large dowry; she was the only surviving daughter of Louis Philippe I, Duke of Orléans and the sister of Philippe Égalité.

The decision of who his future spouse would be was sealed by his mother's close correspondence with the powerful Empress Maria Theresa of Austria, who had promised Ferdinand's parents the throne of the Netherlands, which had been returned to Austrian rule under the Treaty of Aix-la-Chapelle. This never occurred and, as a result, an alliance with the Austrian Empire was used to cement the two nations. This alliance was also encouraged by the Parmese Prime Minister, du Tillot, who had worked at Versailles and had been exiled by Louis XV of France due to his liberal ideas, which were not looked upon with much enthusiasm by those at Versailles.

Reign
Guillaume du Tillot was again used during Ferdinand's reign when he lost his father in 1765 at age 14. Negotiations and ideas were passed from Vienna to Parma, and in 1769 Ferdinand was to marry Archduchess Maria Amalia of Austria; the eighth child of the Empress and elder sister of the Queen of Naples and Sicily and the future Queen of France. Maria Amalia had a marriage by proxy in Vienna on 27 June and left her home on 1 July. The future duchess would meet her husband at Mantua on 16 July. His wife was with her brother Joseph II, Holy Roman Emperor and Ferdinand with members of the Sforza family. On 19 July there was a formal ceremony for all at the Ducal Palace of Colorno where Ferdinand had been born. During many festivities, the couple made their official entrance to Parma on 24 July. They had nine children in just under twenty years.

Expelling the Jesuits, abolishing the jurisdiction of the Inquisition within his domains, and suppressing many redundant monasteries, Ferdinand has sometimes been classed among the more minor exponents of Enlightened absolutism.

Ferdinand ceded the Duchy of Parma to France in the Treaty of Aranjuez (1801). The Treaty of Aranjuez was signed on 21 March 1801 between France and Spain. The overall accord confirmed the terms presented in the Treaty of San Ildefonso. Moreover, Ferdinand agreed to surrender the Duchy of Parma (with Piacenza and Guastalla) to France. Ferdinand's son Louis received the Grand Duchy of Tuscany, which became the Kingdom of Etruria. Ferdinand III, the Habsburg Grand Duke of Tuscany, was compensated with the secularized territories of the Archbishop of Salzburg.

He died in Parma at age 51, suspected to be poisoned although French authorities cited another reason for his death, and was buried in the church of Fontevivo Abbey. On his deathbed, however, he named a regency council with his wife Maria Amalia as its head, clearly still opposing the terms of the Treaty of Aranjuez regarding his duchy. The regency lasted only for days and the Duchy of Parma was annexed to France.

Issue
Ferdinand and his wife Maria Amalia had nine children:
  Princess Carolina (22 November 1770 – 1 March 1804); married in 1792 to Maximilian, Crown Prince of Saxony and had eight children.
 Prince Louis (5 July 1773 – 27 May 1803); married in 1795 to her cousin, Princess Maria Luisa of Spain, and they had two children. Louis became the first King of Etruria.
 Princess Maria Antonia (28 November 1774 – 20 February 1841); she was engaged to a prince of the House of Savoy but he died and she became a Ursuline nun in 1803 with the name of Sister Luisa Maria.
 Princess Maria Carlotta (1 September 1777 – 6 April 1813); she became a Dominican nun in 1797 with the name of Sister Giacinta Domenica.
 Prince Philip Maria (22 May 1783  – 2 July 1786); died at the age of three years due to scurvy.
 Princess Maria Antonietta Luisa (21 October 1784 – 22 October 1785); died at the age of one year due to smallpox.
 Princess Maria Luisa (17 April 1787 – 22 November 1789); died at the age of two due to pleurisy.
 Stillborn son and daughter (21 May 1789).

Ancestry

References

1751 births
1802 deaths
House of Bourbon-Parma
Princes of Bourbon-Parma
Dukes of Parma
Dukes of Guastalla
Princes of Parma and Piacenza
Knights of the Golden Fleece of Spain
Burials at the Sanctuary of Santa Maria della Steccata